As Sure as the Sun is the debut studio album from the Christian singer and songwriter Ellie Holcomb. The album released on February 18, 2014, by Full Heart Music, which is her own independent label. The album was produced by her father noted Christian music producer Brown Bannister along with Ben Shive. This album has received critical acclaim from music critics and it attained significant commercial sales.

Critical reception

As Sure as the Sun garnered critical acclaim from fourteen music critics ratings and reviews. David Jeffries of AllMusic rated the album four stars out of five, remarking that the release is "A superb, often stunning, debut." At CCM Magazine, Matt Conner rated the album a perfect five stars, writing that the release "is a beautiful triumphant album that will undoubtedly stand as this years favorites." Amanda Furbeck of Worship Leader rated the album four-and-a-half stars out of five, stating that the release comes with "an uplifting, light-hearted acoustic feel, gently blurring the lines between light pop and country styles" on which "features hope-filled vocals, a hint of country/bluegrass instrumentation, and pop-styled piano riffs." Chris Webb remarks for Cross Rhythms that "This is an album of variation, light and shade, grayscale and colour, a warm welcome into the world of Elllie Holcomb."

At Indie Vision Music, Jonathan Andre rated the album four stars out of five, saying that "Each song, while not necessarily as pop or rock as many songs are on the radio, still speaks volumes of truths to us as we hear it." Kevin Davis of New Release Tuesday rated the album four-and-a-half stars out of five, writing that "This is truly a great album and a moving and prayerful worship experience" on which contains "captivating and catchy songs filled with inspirational lyrics." At Christian Music Review, Amanda Brogan rated the album four stars out of five, stating that Holcomb "shines" on "a wonderfully positive alternative for those who already enjoy the southern-styled genre and holds words of undeniable life even for those who would generally choose a different form of music." Joshua Andre of Christian Music Zine rated the album four-and-a-half stars out of five, calling this a "stellar effort, and near flawless arrangements of quality treasures" to behold.

At Jesus Freak Hideout, they have three reviews on the album, and all were four stars out of five, from Jen Rose, Mark Geil and Roger Gelwicks. Rose states that the album is not one demanding "attention" nor a "groundbreaking" effort, however on the release Holcomb "uses [...] her raw writing material" to create tracks, which "have a way of gently sneaking into your heart after a while." Geil writes that due to the usage of a contemporary vocal style that could be a setback for the album, yet he notes "Few will be bothered by it, but the affectation is really unnecessary and seems to distract from the sweet purity in the vocal underneath. Regardless, this is one fine album!" Gelwicks says that "there is a sense of harmonic completeness that keeps the project afloat from beginning to end; it's rootsy and home-grown, but it's polished, attractive, and above all, worshipful."

Louder Than the Music's Jono Davies rated the album a perfect five stars, and according to him "There is a clean, fresh sound to these songs which make you feel this isn't just an artist copying another artist, this is Ellie singing her stories and her feelings on one amazing album."  At Jesus Wired, Jessica Morris rated the album eight out of ten stars, affirming that Holcomb "does not disappoint" because the release contains "stunning vocal control and truthful lyrics". Timothy Yap at Hallels gave a positive review of the album, remarking that "Ultimately, there are songs that entertain and there are songs that transform via Scripture", and this release marks a rarity because the listener "will get both on one record." At The Sound Opinion, Andrew Greenhalgh gave a positive review of the album, noting that the album is not one that is revolutionary, but it is a release "that is warm and honest in every way".

Awards and accolades
The album was No. 5 on the Worship Leaders Top 5 Community Funded and Indie Releases of 2014 list.

Commercial performance
For the Billboard charting week of March 8, 2014, As Sure as the Sun was the No. 34 most sold album in the entirety of the United States via the Billboard 200 placement, and it was the No. 2 most sold album on the Christian Albums chart. In addition, the album was the No. 7 most sold of the Independent Albums.

Track listing

Personnel
The music was recorded during 2013 at The Beehive and The Trophy Room in Nashville, Tennessee and at Townsend Sound in nearby Franklin, Tennessee.Production Brown Bannister
 Ben ShiveAdditional musicians Ellie Holcomb - acoustic guitar, leading vocals, background vocals 
 Brown Bannister – background vocals (additional on "Love Never Fails")
 Melissa Broadwell – background vocals (additional on "Broken Beautiful", "Love Broke Through", "Marvelous Light")
 Nathan Dugger – acoustic guitar, banjo, electric guitar, lap steel guitar, mandolin
 Jillian Edwards – background vocals (additional on "Songs of Deliverance")
 Drew Holcomb – background vocals (additional on "The Valley")
 Danny Oertli – background vocals (additional on "Marvelous Light")
 Mike Payne - guitar (additional on "Love Never Fails")
 Matt Pierson – bass guitar
 Will Sayles - drums, percussion
 Ben Shive – keys, dulcimer, piano and background vocals (additional on "Marvelous Light")
 Nicole Witt – background vocals (additional on "Night Song")
     Technical Brown Bannister – engineering
 Lani Crump – mixing coordinator
 Justin Dowse - mixing assistant
 David McNair – mastering
 Buckley Miller – engineering
 Ben Shive – engineering, programming
 Shane D. Wilson – mixingMiscellaneous'
 Jon Dicus – art direction, design
 Darius Fitzgerald – photography

Chart performance

References

2014 debut albums
Albums produced by Brown Bannister
Kickstarter-funded albums
Ellie Holcomb albums